Guy Dash (also Romanized as Gūy Dāsh; also known as Garī Dāsh) is a village in Charuymaq-e Jonubegharbi Rural District, in the Central District of Charuymaq County, East Azerbaijan Province, Iran. At the 2006 census, its population was 213, in 34 families.

References 

Populated places in Charuymaq County